The Montería Fault is a thrust fault in the department of Córdoba in northern Colombia.

Etymology 
The fault is named after Montería.

Description 
The fault is located in the northwest corner of the country. It extends through the Sinú Valley and passes close to the city of Montería. The fault places upper Tertiary rocks of the Sinú Belt (to the west) against lower Tertiary rocks of the San Jacinto Belt (to the east). To the north, the fault is covered by young alluvial deposits.

See also 

 List of earthquakes in Colombia
 Bucaramanga-Santa Marta Fault
 Romeral Fault System

References

Bibliography 
 
 

Seismic faults of Colombia
Thrust faults
Inactive faults
Faults